Cerovec pri Šmarju is a dispersed settlement in the Municipality of Šmarje pri Jelšah in eastern Slovenia. It lies in the Kozje region in the hills to the south of Šmarje pri Jelšah. The area is part of the traditional region of Styria. The municipality is now included in the Savinja Statistical Region.

Name
Like other settlements that share the common name Cerovec (e.g., Cerovec pri Črešnjevcu, Cerovec pod Bočem, Veliki Cerovec, etc.), the name is derived from the Slovene common noun cer 'Turkey oak' and originally refers to the local vegetation. The name of the settlement was changed from Cerovec to Cerovec pri Šmarju (literally, 'Cerovec near Šmarje') in 1955.

Mass graves
Cerovec pri Šmarju is the site of two mass graves from the period immediately after the Second World War. They both contain the remains of an unknown number of local Slovene civilians from the Šmarje pri Jelšah area that were murdered after the war. The Kolen Cave Mass Grave is located on the northeast edge of a meadow next to the woods, 290 m north of the road from Šmarje pri Jelšah, near the Mlinarič farm (Kamenik no. 8). The Pond Mass Grave is located in a meadow that was turned into a pond after the war.

References

External links
Cerovec pri Šmarju at Geopedia

Populated places in the Municipality of Šmarje pri Jelšah